Kelly Marie McDougall (born 22 January 1984) is an English former international footballer. She played in midfield for Everton Ladies and Sunderland Women. She also works at Bothal Primary School, as a PE teacher.

Club career

McDougall joined Everton aged 12, and also played youth football for Knowsley and Rainhill United. She continued to play for Everton while attending the National Player Development Centre at Loughborough University and was an unused substitute when the club won the 2008 FA Women's Premier League Cup.

That August McDougall left Everton after 10 years in the team to sign for Sunderland Women in the FA Women's Premier League Northern Division. In her first season at her new club McDougall helped them to promotion and the FA Women's Cup final. Her stoppage-time goal was not enough to win the cup, as Arsenal won 2–1 at Pride Park. In November 2009 McDougall scored the winner as Sunderland beat Arsenal 2–1, only The Gunners' second league defeat in six years.

International career

McDougall scored on her England U16 debut, against Scotland in Dublin. She also played at U18 level then became a regular at U19 level, featuring in the 2002 FIFA U-19 Women's World Championship.

McDougall made her debut for the senior England team in a 1–0 friendly defeat in Italy on 25 February 2003.

McDougall works for Bothal Primary School in Ashington and teaches P.E (info from Bothal student)

References

External links

Kelly McDougall at Sunderland WFC

English women's footballers
Sunderland A.F.C. Ladies players
Everton F.C. (women) players
England women's international footballers
FA Women's National League players
Women's Super League players
1984 births
Living people
Women's association football midfielders